Stellvester Ajero (born June 16, 1995), better known by his stage name Stell, is a Filipino  singer, songwriter, dancer, and choreographer. Known for his wide vocal range, he is the main vocalist, lead dancer and main choreographer of the Filipino boy band SB19 managed under ShowBT Philippines.

Early life 
Stell was born on June 16, 1995 in Las Piñas City, Metro Manila, Philippines. He studied Hotel and Restaurant Management at the STI College. Before joining SB19, he is a member of a dance cover group called ‘SE-EON together with his fellow SB19's member, Josh. Stell's inspirations were Filipino balladeer Jed Madela, the first Filipino to win the World Championships of Performing Arts title and the Filipina vocalist, singer and producer Morissette. He also admired Filipino TV host-actress Toni Gonzaga, and the style of Maris Racal. His music inspirations are the pop icon Bruno Mars and South Korean boy band, VIXX.

Career

2018-2021: SB19 
In 2016, Stell auditioned for ShowBT Philippines. He is the only member who chose to stay in the training before some members returned and continued what they started and debuted as SB19. As a former member of a dance cover group, he became the lead dancer and main choreographer. Also, Stell is the only soprano member of SB19 dubbed as "Heavenly Voice," as he became the band's main vocalist. 

On 26 October 2018, Stell debuted with fellow members Pablo, Josh, Justin, and Ken with "Tilaluha" written by Pablo himself. 

Stell choreographed the dance routine of "What?", the first single of their extended play Pagsibol.

2022–present
Stell was chosen as one of the performers in the musical show called "A Night of Wonder with Disney+" in November 2022 during the launch of streaming platform Disney+ in the Philippines. He sang his rendition of "Circle of Life" originally performed by Elton John, which was an original soundtrack for the 1994 film The Lion King.

Discography

Production credits 
All song credits are adapted from the Tidal, unless otherwise noted.

Awards and nominations

References 

SB19 members
1995 births
Living people
Filipino singer-songwriters
English-language singers from the Philippines
21st-century Filipino male singers
Filipino male pop singers
Filipino male dancers
Filipino male models
Filipino dance musicians
Sony Music Philippines artists
ShowBT Entertainment artists